Dance with Me may refer to:

Film and theatre
 Dance with Me (musical), a 1975 Broadway musical
 Dance with Me (1998 film), an American film directed by Randa Haines
 Dance with Me (2019 film), a Japanese film directed by Shinobu Yaguchi

Music

Albums
 Dance with Me (Debelah Morgan album) or the title song (see below), 2000
 Dance with Me (Friends album) or the title song, 2002
 Dance with Me (Jimmy Sturr and His Orchestra album), 1998
 Dance with Me (Johnny Reid album) or the title song, 2009
 Dance with Me (T.S.O.L. album) or the title song, 1981
 Dance with Me: Music from the Motion Picture, from the 1998 film
 Dance with Me (EP), by Short Stack, 2015
 Dance with Me, by DJ BoBo, 1993
 Dance with Me, by José Alberto "El Canario", 1991
 Dance with Me, by Rosie Gaines, 2015

Songs 
 "Dance with Me" (112 song), 2001
 "Dance with Me" (Air Supply song), 2010
 "Dance with Me" (Alphaville song), 1986
 "Dance with Me" (Debelah Morgan song), 2000
 "Dance with Me" (Drew Seeley song), 2006
 "Dance with Me" (Hot Rod song), 2010
 "Dance with Me" (Justice Crew song), 2011
 "Dance with Me" (Kelly Clarkson song), 2015
 "Dance with Me" (Le Youth song), 2014
 "Dance with Me" (Orleans song), 1975
 "Dance with Me" (Peter Brown song), 1978
 "Dance with Me" (Zoli Ádok song), 2009
 "Dance with Me (Just One More Time)", by Johnny Rodriguez, 1974
 "Dance wit' Me", by Rick James, 1982
 "Dance wiv Me", by Dizzee Rascal, 2008
 "Dance with Me", by Aaron Carter, 2009
 "Dance with Me", by Adam Green from Garfield, 2002
 "Dance with Me", by Alice in Videoland from Maiden Voyage, 2003
 "Dance with Me", by Chad Focus, 2018
 "Dance with Me", by Chic from It's About Time, 2018
 "Dance with Me", by D'Sound, 2015
 "Dance with Me", by Destiny's Child from Survivor, 2001
 "Dance with Me", by Diplo, Thomas Rhett, and Young Thug from Diplo Presents Thomas Wesley, Chapter 1: Snake Oil, 2020
 "Dance with Me", by the Drifters, 1959
 "Dance with Me", by Estelle from The 18th Day, 2004
 "Dance with Me", by Jennifer Lopez from J.Lo, 2001
 "Dance with Me", by the Lords of the New Church from Is Nothing Sacred?, 1983
 "Dance with Me", by Lost Frequencies from Less Is More, 2016
 "Dance with Me", by Old 97's from Blame It on Gravity, 2008
 "Dance with Me", by Petula Clark from My Love, 1966
 "Dance with Me", by Reginald Bosanquet, 1980
 "Dance with Me", by the Sounds from Living in America, 2002
 "Dance with Me", by Steeleye Span from All Around My Hat, 1975
 "Dance with Me", by VBirds, 2003

See also
Baila Conmigo (disambiguation) ("Dance with Me" in Spanish)
Come Dance with Me (disambiguation)